Võidupüha or Victory Day in English or the Victory Day in the Battle of Võnnu in Estonian is a public holiday in Estonia which occurs on June 23. The holiday has been celebrated since 1934 and marks the victory of Estonia and neighboring Latvia in the Battle of Cēsis against the Baltische Landeswehr on June 23, 1919.

History 
The battle was part of the 1918–1920 Estonian Liberation War of Independence, in which the new Estonian government fought the Soviet Union's Red Army and the Baltische Landeswehr, which consisted of Baltic German nobility from Courland and the Governorate of Livonia who served the German Empire and aimed to establish the United Baltic Duchy. After the fighting began On 19 June, the combined force of the 3rd Division, the Kuperjanov Infantry Partisian Battalion and the Latvian Northern Brigade held out for reinforcements arriving on 21 June despite the fact that they did not have the advantage when it came to weaponry (German troops had 5,500–6,300 infantry, 500–600 cavalry as well as a high number of cannons and mortars). On 23 June, after pushing back the last of the German attacks, the combined contingent staged a large counter-attack which resulted in the recapture of Cēsis (Võnnu in Estonian). After this event, Major General Ernst Põdder ordered his command of the day, "the victories won over our stagnant and surrendered enemy, in cities and in the countryside, flags and armed units in the local garrisons were set up." On 16 February 1934, the Riigikogu decided to turn the 23 of June into a national holiday. The holiday was banned by the new Soviet authorities in Estonia after the USSR re-established Soviet rule over Estonia in 1944. It was also banned by the previous German occupation of Estonia during World War II. It became legal to celebrate Võidupüha again after Estonia regained its independence. The first celebrations of the holiday took place in 1992, in the Kadriorg Palace yard.

Observances 

Joint celebrations are observed by both the Estonian Defence Forces and the Latvian National Armed Forces being that it was a joint victory between the two countries. Despite this, Estonia celebrates Victory Day more as a national holiday and event unlike their Latvian counterparts. Celebrations of Võidupüha has been organized by the Estonian Defence League since 2000. Ceremonially, the holiday is also tied to St John's Day (Jaaniõhtu)  on June 24, celebrating the summer solstice observances and the Nativity of Saint John the Baptist.

The traditional lighting of a fire by the Estonian President on the morning of Victory Day was restored after the Soviet occupation From this fire, the flame of independence would be carried across the country to light the many other bonfires in other cities. By Estonian laws, all national symbols must be present, which requires that the state flags  are not to be lowered on any government buildings during the night that passes between these two days.

Annual military parades have taken place in honor of Võidupüha in different cities of Estonia, with the President of Estonia presiding over the event as Honorary Commander-in-Chief of the Defense Forces.

See also
 Independence Day (Estonia)
 Public holidays in Estonia
 Victory Day

References 

Public holidays in Estonia
Victory days